Pel Maoudé is a village and rural commune and seat of the Cercle of Koro in the Mopti Region of Mali. The commune covers an area of approximately 203 square kilometers and includes 9 villages. In the 2009 census the commune had a population of 13,727.

Some typical cultivated plants are millet, peanut, black-eyed pea, fonio and Sesame.

References

External links
.

Communes of Mopti Region